The Comstock laws were a set of federal acts passed by the United States Congress under the Grant administration along with related state laws. The "parent" act (Sect. 211) was passed on March 3, 1873, as the Act for the Suppression of Trade in, and Circulation of, Obscene Literature and Articles of Immoral Use. This Act criminalized any use of the U.S. Postal Service to send any of the following items: obscenity, contraceptives, abortifacients, sex toys, personal letters with any sexual content or information, or any information regarding the above items.

A similar federal act (Sect. 245) of 1909 applied to delivery by interstate "express" or any other common carrier (such as railroad), rather than delivery by the U.S. Post Office. In addition to these federal laws, about half of the states enacted laws related to the federal Comstock laws.  These state laws are considered by women's rights activist Mary Dennett to also be "Comstock laws". The laws were named after their chief proponent, US Postal Inspector and anti-vice activist Anthony Comstock. Comstock received a commission from the Postmaster General to serve as a special agent for the U.S. Post Office Department.

In Washington, D.C., where the federal government had direct jurisdiction, another Comstock act (Sect. 312) also made it illegal (punishable by up to five years at hard labor), to sell, lend, or give away any "obscene" publication, or article used for contraception or abortion.  Section 305 of the Tariff Act of 1922 forbade the importation of any contraceptive information or means.

Numerous failed attempts were made to repeal or modify these laws and eventually, many of them (or portions of them) were declared unconstitutional.  In a 1919 issue of the Journal of Criminal Law & Criminology, Judge J. C. Ruppenthal, after reviewing the various laws (especially state laws) called the set of acts "haphazard and capricious" and lacking "any clear, broad, well-defined principle or purpose".

The restrictions on birth control in the Comstock laws were effectively rendered null and void by Supreme Court decisions Griswold v. Connecticut (1965) and Eisenstadt v. Baird (1972). Furthermore Congress removed the restrictions on contraception in 1971 but let the rest of the Comstock law stand.

Text of the parent federal law for the United States 
This original Section 211 (enacted 1873) of the Federal Criminal Code (considered to be the "parent" of all the Comstock laws) reads as follows:
"Every obscene, lewd, or lascivious, and every filthy book, pamphlet, picture, paper, letter, writing, print, or other publication of an indecent character, and every article or thing designed, adapted, or intended for preventing conception or producing abortion, or for any indecent or immoral use; and every article, instrument, substance, drug, medicine, or thing which is advertised or described in a manner calculated to lead another to use or apply it for preventing conception or producing abortion, or for any indecent or immoral purpose and every written or printed card, letter, circular, book, pamphlet advertisement, or notice of any kind giving information directly or indirectly, where, or how, or of whom, or by what means any of the hereinbefore-mentioned matters, articles or things may be obtained or made, or where or by whom any act or operation of any kind for the procuring or producing of abortion will be done or performed or how or by what means conception may be prevented or abortion may be produced, whether sealed or unsealed; and every letter, packet, or package, or other mail matter containing any filthy, vile, or indecent thing, device or substance and every paper, writing, advertisement or representation that any article, instrument, substance, drug, medicine, or thing may, or can be, used or applied, for preventing conception or producing abortion, or for any indecent or immoral purpose; and every description calculated to induce or incite a person to so use or apply any such article, instrument, substance, drug, medicine, or thing, is hereby declared to be a non-mailable matter and shall not be conveyed in the mails or delivered from any post office or by any letter carrier. Whoever shall knowingly deposit or cause to be deposited for mailing or delivery, anything declared by this section to be non-mailable, or shall knowingly take, or cause the same to be taken, from the mails for the purpose of circulating or disposing thereof, or of aiding in the circulation or disposition thereof, shall be fined not more than five thousand dollars, or imprisoned not more than five years, or both."

Original section replaced by the parent federal law of the Comstock Laws 
The following passage is the original Section 148 of the 1872 Amendment "An Act to revise, consolidate, and amend the Statutes relating to the Post-office Department," before it was changed by the parent act of the Comstock Laws, Section 211 of the Federal Criminal Code, in 1873.(United States, Congress, "An Act to Revise, Consolidate, and Amend the Statutes Relating to the Post-Office Department." An Act to Revise, Consolidate, and Amend the Statutes Relating to the Post-Office Department, pp. 302–302.)

Sec. 148.  "That no obscene book. pamphlet, picture, print, or any other publication of a vulgar or indecent character, or any letter upon the envelope of which, or postal card upon which scurrilous epithets may have been written or printed, or disloyal devices printed or engraved, shall be carried in the mail; and any person who shall knowingly deposit, or cause to be deposited, for mailing or for delivery, any such obscene publication, shall be deemed guilty of a misdemeanor, and, on conviction thereof, shall, for every such offense, be fined not more than five hundred dollars, or imprisoned not more than one year, or both, according to the circumstances and aggravation of the offense."

This section was amended by the second section of Chapter 258 of the third session of the forty-second Congress.  The revision aimed to be more specific in its rhetoric, as well as condemning the act more than the prior edition, including the advertisement of mentioned obscenities as a punishable offense.  Another way this was conveyed in the amendment was by also intensifying the punishment of being convicted of this offense by increasing the fine and imprisonment time intervals, while also clarifying that imprisonment includes hard labor.  The revision included the advertisement of mentioned obscenities as a punishable offense.

Text of the federal law for the District of Columbia

The text of this act (sect. 312 of the Federal Criminal Code) read, in part:

Be it enacted.... That whoever, within the District of Columbia or any of the Territories of the United States... shall sell... or shall offer to sell, or to lend, or to give away, or in any manner to exhibit, or shall otherwise publish or offer to publish in any manner, or shall have in his possession, for any such purpose or purposes, an obscene book, pamphlet, paper, writing, advertisement, circular, print, picture, drawing or other representation, figure, or image on or of paper or other material, or any cast instrument, or other article of an immoral nature, or any drug or medicine, or any article whatever, for the prevention of conception, or for causing unlawful abortion, or shall advertise the same for sale, or shall write or print, or cause to be written or printed, any card, circular, book, pamphlet, advertisement, or notice of any kind, stating when, where, how, or of whom, or by what means, any of the articles in this section…can be purchased or obtained, or shall manufacture, draw, or print, or in any wise make any of such articles, shall be deemed guilty of a misdemeanor, and on conviction thereof in any court of the United States... he shall be imprisoned at hard labor in the penitentiary for not less than six months nor more than five years for each offense, or fined not less than one hundred dollars nor more than two thousand dollars, with costs of court.

This was considered to be one of the most sweeping of all the Comstock laws. Forbidden items may legally be possessed if they are only for one's own use and will not be distributed to others.

Current statute

The Comstock laws are now codified at 18 U.S.C. Chapter 71, §§ 1460–1470

State laws on birth control (contraception), etc.

Per Ruppenthal 1919
The following is copied from lead part (pp. 48–50) of Ruppenthal. Modified text is in italics with reasons for such modification in a footnote.  Note that Ruppenthal and Dennett differ on some topics and the research to determine who is correct has not yet been done.

Journal of Criminal Law and Criminology,
Volume 10, Issue 1, Article 5. 1919. Criminal Statutes on Birth Control; J. C. Ruppenthal.full text

In the United States, laws relating to birth control seem to have been developed since about 1870. Congress, the legislatures of nineteen states and Puerto Rico, and the commission of the Canal Zone, have enacted statutes that clearly and definitely refer to the prevention of conception in women as a practice to be deterred  by such laws.  In only one state, Connecticut, is the actual act of using contraception a crime, In Canada, at least Ontario has such a law deterring contraception'. Twenty-two more states of the Union, and also Hawaii have statutes which
the courts, with liberality of construction or strictness, hold to
apply or not apply criminally to the matter of birth control, at
least through prevention of conception, or "contraception."
The District of Columbia, and the states of Rhode Island and Florida
have kindred enactments, relating in the states to causing miscarriage of a pregnant woman, and in the District to abortion. Four
states, Georgia, New Hampshire, New Mexico, and North Carolina,
and also Alaska, appear to have no legislation that either certainly
or possibly may be held to apply to birth control. All the forty-
nine sets of enactments referred to, are found in the statute books
under "obscenity" and "offenses against morals," as headings. In
most cases the phraseology relating to contraception is found embedded among many clauses relating to pornographic or non-mailable
matter, to indecent and immoral printing, writing, painting and the
like. Colorado, Indiana and Wyoming mention "self-pollution," and
Massachusetts names "self-abuse" along with abortion and prevention
of conception.

Clear and definite laws on contraception are found on the statute
books of the states of Arizona, California, Colorado, Connecticut,
Idaho, Indiana, Iowa, Kansas, Massachusetts, Minnesota, Montana,
New Jersey, New York, North Dakota, Ohio, Oklahoma, Washington
and Wyoming-eighteen-as well as Puerto Rico, Ontario, the Canal
Zone and the United States. The federal laws are quite full in expression, and perhaps served as model for most of the states.

If a court regards written matter relating to contraception or
means to accomplish this, as "obscene, vulgar and indecent," then laws
apply also in the states of Alabama, Arkansas, Delaware, Hawaii,
Illinois, Kentucky, Louisiana, Maine, Maryland, Michigan, Mississippi,
Missouri, Nebraska, Pennsylvania, Nevada, Oregon, South Carolina,
South Dakota, Tennessee, Texas, Utah, Vermont, Virginia, West
Virginia and Wisconsin-twenty-five in number. In some states a
limitation is "if they manifest a tendency to corrupt the morals of
youth," or morals generally.

"Articles and instruments of immoral use or purpose" are denounced, but no specific purpose or object of such is set out, in the
laws of Connecticut, Illinois, Kentucky, Louisiana, Michigan, Mississippi, Missouri, Nebraska, Oregon, Pennsylvania, Rhode Island and
Utah. Would courts hold that contraceptives or what are today called sex toys were such articles?  In Maryland "obscene and indecent" books are mentioned, and
"obscene" matters in South Carolina, with no more specific designation.   In Ontario the law very widely includes the assertion or warranty of the offender, as the language is "any article intended or represented as a means of preventing conception or causing abortion." To make prosecutions more easy, Idaho provides that the complaint
need not set out any portion of the language alleged to have been
unlawfully used. To aid in capture of contraband articles, instruments and literature or other things, search warrants or seizure, or both, are authorized in Arizona, California, Colorado, Idaho and Nevada.

Where advice or information as to abortion is forbidden, though
some states, as Minnesota and New York, carefully discriminate against
"unlawful abortion," others, as Kansas and Iowa, say, "procuring
abortion," with no intimation that such could, in any case, be lawful.
Kansas, however, in another statute-as to manslaughter of a woman
pregnant or her child-excepts "when it shall be necessary to save the
life of the mother," and thus inferentially distinguishes acts as of
two classes.

While some statutes are word for word alike in several states,
most of them vary in scope. Among the forbidden acts, in connection
with articles, instruments, books, papers, etc., are to "exhibit" (United States law and Colorado) ; "bring into the state" (Alabama) ; "import"
(Hawaii) ; "buy," "sell," "lend," "keep for sale," "have in possession,"
(Iowa) ; "have in possession with intent to sell," "have possession with
or without intent to sell" (Indiana) ; "advertise," "distribute" (New
York); "manufacture," ('Missouri, New York); "has possession with
intent to utter or expose to view or to sell," "for gratuitous distribution" (in Ohio, drug or nostrum; in Kansas, literature);. "conveying
notice, hint or reference to," under "real or fictitious name" (Rhode
Island); "give information orally" (New York, Minnesota, Indiana);
"write, compose, or publish" (notice or advertisement, in Arizona);
"manifesting a tendency to the corruption of the morals of youth or
of morals generally," (Hawaii) ; "cautions females against its use when
in pregnancy" (Ohio); "drug or nostrum purporting to be exclusively
for the use of females" (Ohio). To meet the ingenuity of evasive
devices, New Jersey includes all persons "who shall in any manner,
by recommendation against its use or otherwise give or cause to be
given, or aid in giving any information, how or where any of the
(literature, instruments, medicines, etc.) may be had or seen or bought
or sold." Whatever is prohibited directly to anyone is usually expanded in terms to include aiding in any way toward the forbidden end.

A few exceptions from the sweeping provisions are incorporated.
In Ontario the offense must be "knowingly, without lawful excuse or
justification ;" in New Jersey, "without just cause." In some states
the law provides that it "shall not be construed to affect teaching in
medical colleges" (Colorado, Indiana, Ohio); "nor standard medical
books" (Colorado, Indiana, Kansas, Ohio) ; "nor the practice of regular practitioners of medicine and druggists (Colorado) in their legitimate 'business" (Ohio); "nor works of scientific character, or on
anatomy, surgery or obstetrics" (Kentucky); "article or instrument
used or applied by physicians is not … indecent." In Connecticut possession of the things forbidden is unlawful "unless with intent to aid in their suppression or in enforcing the provisions" of the law.

Almost everything denounced under any of these laws is nonmailable under the laws of the United States, Colorado, Illinois, Indiana, Iowa, Missouri, Nebraska, Ohio, and New York. Delivery of such to express or railroad companies is forbidden by the United States, Illinois, Indiana and New York. Besides forbidding the deposit of such matters in the mails, Colorado adds "or with any person."

From the foregoing it may be seen that no general principle runs through the statutes of all the states, etc. As with laws everywhere that impinge upon sex matters in any way, there is more of taboo and superstition in the choice and chance, the selection and caprice, the inclusions and exclusions of these several enactments than any clear, broad, well-defined principle or purpose underlying them. Without such principle, well-defined and generally accepted, the various laws must remain largely haphazard and capricious.

Per Dennett 1926, only on contraception

This section is copied directly from Appendix No. 1 (pp. 280–) of the book "Birth Control Laws ..." by Mary Dennett, 1926.  In contrast to Ruppenthal (previous section) Dennett (researched by Dilla) only deals with the contraception aspects of the Comstock laws.

The Scope of the Various State Laws Is Given in the Following Compilation

The research work was done by Harriette M. Dilla, LL.B., Ph.D., formerly of the Department of Sociology and Economics of Smith College.

Twenty-four States (and Puerto Rico) specifically penalize contraceptive knowledge in their obscenity laws.

Twenty-four States (and the District of Columbia, Alaska and Hawaii) have obscenity laws, under which, because of the Federal precedent, contraceptive knowledge may be suppressed as obscene, although it is not specifically mentioned. Obscenity has never been defined in law. This produces a mass of conflicting, inconsistent judicial decision, which would be humorous, if it were not such a mortifying revelation of the limitations and perversions of the human mind.

Twenty-three States make it a crime to publish or advertise contraceptive information. They are as follows:
Arizona, California, Colorado, Idaho, Indiana, Iowa, Kansas, Maine, Massachusetts, Minnesota, Mississippi, Missouri, Montana, Nebraska, Nevada, New Jersey, New York, North Dakota, Ohio, Oklahoma, Pennsylvania,
Washington, Wyoming; also Puerto Rico.

Twenty-two States include in their prohibition drugs and instruments for the prevention of conception. There are far fewer in this category per Ruppenthal, They are as follows: Arizona, California, Colorado, Connecticut, Idaho, Indiana, Iowa, Kansas, Massachusetts, Minnesota, Mississippi, Missouri, Montana, Nebraska, Nevada, New Jersey, New York, Ohio, Oklahoma, Pennsylvania, Washington, Wyoming and Puerto Rico.

Eleven States make it a crime to have in one's possession any instruction for contraception. These are: Colorado, Indiana, Iowa, Minnesota, Mississippi, New Jersey, New York, North Dakota, Ohio, Pennsylvania, Wyoming.

Fourteen States make it a crime to tell anyone where or how contraceptive knowledge may be acquired. These are :
Colorado, Indiana, Iowa, Massachusetts, Minnesota, Mississippi, Missouri, Montana, Nevada, New Jersey, New
York, Pennsylvania, Washington, Wyoming.

Six States prohibit the offer to assist in any method whatever which would lead to knowledge by which contraception might be accomplished. These are: Arizona, California, Idaho, Montana, Nevada, Oklahoma and Puerto Rico.

Eight States prohibit depositing in the Post Office any contraceptive information. These are: Colorado, Indiana,
Iowa, Minnesota, New York, North Dakota, Ohio, Wyoming.

One State, Colorado, prohibits the bringing into the State of any contraceptive knowledge.

Four States have laws authorizing the search for and seizure of contraceptive instructions, and these are: Colorado, Idaho, Iowa, Oklahoma. In all these States but Idaho, the laws authorize the destruction of the things seized.

Certain exemptions from the penalties of these laws are made by the States for

Medical Colleges: Colorado Indiana Missouri Nebraska Ohio Pennsylvania Wyoming

Medical Books: Colorado Indiana Kansas Missouri Nebraska Ohio Pennsylvania Wyoming

Physicians: Colorado Indiana Nevada New York Ohio Wyoming

Druggists: Colorado, Indiana, Ohio, Wyoming.

Seventeen States prohibit any information which corrupts morals, 12 of them, as starred in the following list, particularly mentioning the morals of the young. This is an interesting point of view of the frequently offered objection to freedom of access to contraceptive knowledge, that it will demoralize the young. These States are: Colorado, Delaware,* Florida,* Iowa,* Maine,* Massachusetts,* Michigan,* Rhode Island, South Carolina, South Dakota, Tennessee, Texas,* Vermont,* Virginia,* West Virginia,* Wisconsin * and Hawaii.

Two States have no obscenity statutes, but police power in these States can suppress contraceptive knowledge as an "Obscenity" or "public nuisance," by virtue of the Federal precedent. These States are: North Carolina and New Mexico.

Objective of the laws
The Comstock laws targeted pornography, contraceptive equipment, and such educational materials as descriptions of contraceptive methods and other reproductive health-related materials. Of particular note were advertisements for abortifacients found in penny papers, which offered pills to women as treatment for "obstruction of their monthly periods."

Comstock's ideas of what is "obscene, lewd, or lascivious" were quite broad. During his time of greatest power, some anatomy textbooks were prohibited from being sent to medical students by the United States Postal Service.

However, it is claimed that Comstock had "no intention of penalizing normal birth control information" (with "normal" likely meaning within marriage). Yet the laws engendered by him did significantly penalize birth control information for all uses. Comstock (and others) thought that contraceptives (and information about them) would be used (or misused) by young people for premarital sex (then considered to be wrong and immoral by some people). Thus, Comstock's reasoning seems to have been that if one banned all contraceptive information, etc., the morals of youth were less likely to be corrupted.

Definition of obscenity
Major parts of the Comstock Acts hinge on definitions, particularly of obscenity.  Though the courts originally adopted the British Hicklin test, in 1957 an American test was put into place in Roth v. United States, in which it was determined that obscenity was material whose "dominant theme taken as a whole appeals to the prurient interest" to the "average person, applying contemporary community standards," and was, "utterly without redeeming social importance."

Origins
According to Paul R. Abramson, the widespread availability of pornography during the American Civil War  (1861–1865) gave rise to an anti-pornography movement, culminating in the passage of the Comstock Act in 1873, but which also dealt with birth control and abortion issues.  A major supporter and active persecutor for the moral purposes of the Comstock laws was the New York Society for the Suppression of Vice, led by Comstock.

YMCA
In February 1866, the Young Men's Christian Association (YMCA) of New York's executive committee privately distributed a report that was written by Cephas Brainerd and Robert McBurney entitled, "A Memorandum Respecting New-York as a Field for Moral and Christian Effort Among Young Men." This memorandum linked the main message of the YMCA to facts and figures that were drawn from the census, tax data, and licensing reports. All of this data was used to support the idea that many of the younger, more unsupervised members of the society had more than enough free time in the evenings to spend in billiard saloons, gambling halls, porter houses, and houses of prostitution and assignation.

The 1866 memorandum supported a plan to construct a centrally located building to better serve the younger men of New York. Not only was the building to support the spiritual, mental, and social well-being of the young men, it was also suggested to benefit their physical condition. However, the memorandum was also used as a "call to action" to investigate whether or not a law was in place to reprimand and confiscate "obscene" literature. After conferring with a district attorney, a committee was organized to write up a bill to be pushed through the New York State legislature. In 1868, the bill was passed; however, it was not as strong as the association would have liked it to be. After the passing of the bill, the YMCA appointed a committee to oversee the enforcement of the law. This law included the important power of search and seizure which authorized magistrates to issue warrants that allowed police officers "to search for, seize and take possession of such obscene and indecent books, papers, articles and things" and hand them over to the district attorney. If the indicted party ended up being found guilty, the materials that were confiscated in the raid were destroyed.

Anthony Comstock
Anthony Comstock stated that he was determined to act the part of a good citizen, meaning that he had every intention of upholding the law. He started off by beginning a campaign against the saloons in his New York neighborhood of Brooklyn.

The biggest contributor to igniting Comstock's mission to rid of any and all obscene material was when one of his dear friends died. Comstock blamed his death on him being "led astray and corrupted and diseased". As for a person to blame, Comstock laid all of it on Charles Conroy, who had sold his friend "erotic materials" from a basement on Warren Street. After this incident, he continued the crusade throughout his neighborhood and while doing so, kept a ledger that had a record of every arrest he had made.

Comstock became linked with the YMCA shortly after writing a financial request for funding of his efforts. When YMCA President Morris Jesup became aware of the request he visited Comstock and granted the requested funds. in addition to providing the money to support his work, Jesup paid Comstock a bonus.  Comstock was invited to speak before the YMCA's Committee on Obscene Literature (later renamed the Committee for Suppression of Vice) to present how he used the funds the organization had provided. Comstock was eventually hired by the association to help fight for the suppression of vice.

The motivation for Comstock's support of Federal legislation was "The Beecher-Tilton Scandal Case" and the publicity for the case provided by Victoria Woodhull and Tennessee Claflin;  writers for Woodhull & Claflin's Weekly. After Woodhull's acquittal, Comstock began to see weaknesses in the 1872 law. The federal statute did not include newspapers, nor did it specify that birth control information and appliances were "obscene". Comstock made it a goal to  include better language in a new law (later known as the Comstock Law).

To do this, Comstock drafted a new federal bill and with the sponsorship of Representative Clinton L. Merriam, he met with members of the House and illustrated his concern by showing them obscene materials, obtained via the gaps in the existing legislation. Comstock used a connection with Justice William Strong to pass the bill on to William Windom, a senator from Minnesota, with the request that he take the bill to the floor of the Senate. While the bill was being revised, a provision with similar effect of the bill was attached in a federal appropriations bill and was authorized by Congress. The legislation enabled a new special agent in the United States Post Office. This agent held the power to confiscate immoral materials sent in the mail and arrest those sending it.

Although Comstock was awarded the position of special agent, the Committee for the Suppression of Vice requested that he not be given a government salary. In the spring of 1873, the committee became separate from the YMCA, as New York gave them a charter as the New York Society for the Suppression of Vice. While the Comstock Law originally authorized police assistance to the group in censoring materials and gave half of the fines collected under this law, the rewards were removed a month later. By preventing Comstock from receiving a federal salary, as well as any monetary rewards from the state, the organization's directors attempted to prevent claims of self-interested motives. They also tried to ensure that Comstock was dependent on their donations.

Comstock derived his full-time salary from the vice society. At the same time, he was able to hold a federal commission that allowed him to secure warrants for arrests and take and destroy publications and other materials. Therefore, New York, as well as the federal government, gave him most of the responsibility to implement moral censorship. They entrusted that responsibility to Comstock for forty-two years until his death in 1915. Over that period of time, he filled the two positions, one in the Post Office and the other in the New York vice society.

Extended works of Comstock along the lines of the Comstock laws include a petition from the Committee for the Suppression of Vice to include obscene written works that were enclosed in a sealed envelope, an item that was not covered in the renditions of the Comstock Laws, as an item to convict for a punishable offence.  Other works that he tried to enclose under the range of the laws that used his namesake include international art pieces that depicted scantily-clad women, textbooks for medical students, and other items that seem to steer away from the original theme of the laws.  These misguided efforts left some of his original supporters to doubt his intentions.  Comstock's excision of authoritative power as a special agent Postal Inspector included over 3,600 people prosecuted and the destruction of over 160 tons of literature found to be obscene.

Contraceptives in the history of Christianity 
Until the mid-20th Century, Christian leaders generally have been opposed to contraception. The first recorded show of the Christian faith being against contraceptives can be found in the Didache, an early Christian treatise written around 70 AD which condemns the use of contraception along with abortion, infanticide, adultery, and other practices.  This theme of Christian culture continued through the centuries until some churches accepted the use of contraceptives, limited at first to married couples, beginning with the 1930 Lambeth Conference of the Anglican Church.  Previously, the only contraception in use for followers of Christianity was the calendar or rhythm method, which is the tracking of fertility in a woman's body as to avoid having sexual relations within time frames where the woman would be fertile, but instead when she may be considered the least fertile of her menstrual cycle.

Judicial views

Obscenity

In 1957, Samuel Roth, who ran a literary business in New York City, was charged with distributing "obscene, lewd, lascivious or filthy" materials through the mail, advertising and selling a publication called American Aphrodite ("A Quarterly for the Fancy-Free"). The publication contained literary erotica and nude photography.

The Comstock Law was terminated in 1957, just before the Roth v. United States court case, but it defined obscenity laws as anything that appealed to the prurient interest of the consumer. In a similar case, Alberts v. California, David Alberts ran a mail-order business from Los Angeles and was convicted under a Californian statute for publishing pictures of "nude and scantily-clad women". The Supreme Court confirmed the conviction and affirmed the Roth test.

Under the Comstock laws, postal inspectors can bar "obscene" content from the mails at any time, thus having a huge impact on publishers of magazines.  In One, Inc. v. Olesen (1958), as a follow-on to Roth, the Supreme Court granted free press rights around homosexuality.

The Comstock laws banned distribution of sex education information, based on the premise that it was obscene and led to promiscuous behavior Mary Ware Dennett was fined $300 in 1928, for distributing a pamphlet containing sex education material. The American Civil Liberties Union (ACLU), led by Morris Ernst, appealed her conviction and won a reversal, in which judge Learned Hand ruled that the pamphlet's main purpose was to "promote understanding".

Contraception
In 1915, architect William Sanger was charged under the New York law against disseminating contraceptive information. His wife Margaret Sanger was similarly charged in 1915 for her work The Woman Rebel. Sanger circulated this work through the U.S. postal service, effectively violating the Comstock Law. On appeal, her conviction was reversed on the grounds that contraceptive devices could legally be promoted for the cure and prevention of disease.

The prohibition of devices advertised for the explicit purpose of birth control was not overturned for another eighteen years. During World War I, U.S. servicemen were the only members of the Allied forces sent overseas without condoms.

In 1932, Sanger arranged for a shipment of diaphragms to be mailed from Japan to a sympathetic doctor in New York City. When U.S. customs confiscated the package as illegal contraceptive devices, Sanger helped file a lawsuit. In 1936, a federal appeals court ruled in United States v. One Package of Japanese Pessaries that the federal government could not interfere with doctors providing contraception to their patients.

Griswold v. Connecticut (1965) struck down one of the remaining contraception Comstock laws in Connecticut and Massachusetts. However, Griswold only applied to marital relationships. Eisenstadt v. Baird (1972) extended its holding to unmarried persons as well.

In favor of the laws

Obscenity arguments
As the chief proponent of the law, many of Comstock's justifications revolved around the effects that all of the obscene literature would have on children. He argued that the corruption in the schools and in the home were because of all of the obscene literature that the youth had easy access to. He also argued that the vast amounts of "obscenity" would cause for the sanctity of marriage to be corrupted along with the power of the church. Comstock mainly focused on voicing his concerns to families of privilege; this is how he gained a majority of his support.

Clinton L. Merrian, who introduced the bill to the House of Representatives, played on the idea that obscenity was a direct threat to manhood and that in order to protect the children, obscene materials needed to be confiscated.

Contraception arguments
The Comstock laws, in an alleged "haphazard and capricious"  manner, restricted contraception. It was argued that this would help prevent "illicit" sexual relations between unmarried persons since without contraception, the unmarried would be deterred from having sex due to the possibility of undesired pregnancy. When the Birth Control Movement in the mid-1920s was attempting to get Congress to eliminate birth control restrictions from the federal Comstock laws, Mary Dennett (the author of "Birth Control Laws ..." 1926) interviewed a (non-typical) congressman who strongly supported retention of the birth control restrictions in the Comstock laws. He put it this way (avoiding any use of the words "sex" or "pregnancy"): "Think how it would be that night, when the young girl goes out with the boy, and she can’t help thinking, what difference will it make if nothing ever shows? And then she will forget all about character, and will let herself go, whereas if she was afraid of the practical results, she wouldn’t. Yes, there are thousands of girls that are held back just that way."

To this, Mary Dennet asked if he did not know that there was such a lot of contraceptive knowledge in circulation—and that most of it was bad knowledge too—that the number of girls that could be protected by their ignorance was diminishing every hour, and that there was absolutely no effort at enforcement of the laws? He said people argued that way about enforcing the prohibition laws, but he thought it (Comstock laws re contraception) ought to be enforced and could be.

Regarding older, never-married women having sex with contraception, the same congressman talking about a group of women clerks, whose housing was visible through his office window: "a lot of them are confirmed old maids too, but I wouldn’t trust what would happen to them, if they all knew they could do what they pleased and no one would be the wiser." He was thus implying that the Comstock laws were good because they not only deterred young girls from having premarital sex but also deterred "old maids" (derogatory term for older, never-married women) from sexual relations.

Father Charles Coughlin, a famous "radio priest", argued before a congressional committee in 1934 that even use of contraception by a married couple was wrong. He characterized such non-productive sex as "legalized prostitution." There was heckling from the audience, and one woman called out to Coughlin, "You're ridiculous."

Opposition to the laws

1878 repeal attempt 

Three years after the enactment of the federal law, a petition was circulated by the National Liberal League for its repeal in 1876, garnering between 40,000 and 70,000 signatures. Although the press of the country favored repeal, their efforts were impeded when Comstock showed samples of pornographic material to congressmen who were serving on the same committee which the repeal act had been referred to. Comstock claimed that the pamphlets he had shared, a "collection of smutty circulars describing sex depravity", had been distributed by mail to youths and other persons.

In March 1879, the National Defense Association submitted a letter of affidavits to Samuel Sullivan Cox, a Democratic New York State Representative, for review with the Committee on Post Office and Post Roads. The National Defense Association had been established shortly after the Comstock Laws were enacted in order to combat the resulting loss of civil liberties and restrictions on freedom of the press, and to preserve access to works of art or literature which were deemed obscene under the Comstock Act.

The letter of affidavits had been sent in support of the petition from the National Liberal League. Comstock dismissed the petition, alleging that the list was made up of forged signatures and false names. He also complained that "the public press throughout the country" had supported the petitioners and their movement.

Birth control movement failures 
After this failure to repeal, there was no concerted effort to change the laws until the start of the birth control movement in the United States in 1914 led by Margaret Sanger.  Between 1917 and 1925 Bills were introduced in California (1917), New York (1917, 1921,3,4,5), Connecticut (1923, 1925), and New Jersey (1925) to make the anti-birth control parts of the state laws less restrictive.  In both California and Connecticut, the anti-birth control part of the law would be simply eliminated which in Connecticut would mean that its outlawing of contraception would be revoked.   All these state attempts at change failed to come to a vote so no change happened.

There were also failed attempts to eliminate the restrictions on birth control from the federal laws, the first starting in 1919 where the bill's supposed sponsor failed to introduce the bill.  In 1923 a bill was sent to the Judiciary Committee (of Congress).  While it was thought that the majority of this committee favored the bill, they evaded voting on it. There were also more attempts at change in the 1920s.

Eugenics argument 
In response to the argument that facilitating contraception would encourage promiscuity, a rebuttal was that if such persons used contraception, there would tend to be fewer people like them since fewer people would inherit inclinations towards promiscuity.

Free Love
The Free Love Movement was one group that made sustained attempts to repeal the Comstock Laws and discredit anything related to the anti-vice movement. This movement despised the law because they believed it embodied the sexual oppression of women. The free-lovers argued that neither the church nor the state had the right to regulate an individual's sexual relations and that women were sexually enslaved by the institution of marriage. This made the free-lovers the number one target of Comstock and his crusade against obscenity.

See also
 Banned in Boston
 Birth control movement in the United States
 Mary Dennett
 Emma Goldman
 Free Speech League
 Ida Craddock
 New York Society for the Suppression of Vice
 Social hygiene movement
 Obscenity trial of Ulysses in The Little Review
 The Truth Seeker Obscenity Prosecution
 SESTA/FOSTA

Notes

References
 Dennett, Mary Ware  Birth Control Laws: Shall we keep them, change them, or abolish them New York, Grafton Press, 1926.  Full text 
 Ruppenthal, J. C. Criminal Statutes on Birth Control in Journal of Criminal Law and Criminology, vol.10, issue 1, article 5, 1919. 
 United States, Congress, "An Act to Revise, Consolidate, and Amend the Statutes Relating to the Post-Office Department." An Act to Revise, Consolidate, and Amend the Statutes Relating to the Post-Office Department, pp. 302.

Further reading 
 Text of Comstock Law of 1873
 Beisel, Nicola.  Imperiled Innocents: Anthony Comstock and Family Reproduction in Victorian America. Princeton U. Press, 1997.
 Boyer, Paul S.  Purity in Print: Censorship from the Gilded Age to the Computer Age. (1968) Revised ed. 2002.
 Friedman, Andrea.  Prurient Interests: Gender, Democracy, and Obscenity in New York City, 1909–1945. Columbia U. Pr., 2000.
 Gurstein, Rochelle.  The Repeal of Reticence: A History of America's Cultural and Legal Struggles over Free Speech, Obscenity, Sexual Liberation, and Modern Art. Hill & Wang, 1996.
 Hilliard, Robert L. and Keith, Michael C.  Dirty Discourse: Sex and Indecency in American Radio. Iowa State U. Press, 2003.
 Kobylka, Joseph F.  The Politics of Obscenity: Group Litigation in a Time of Legal Change. Greenwood, 1991.
 Wheeler, Leigh Ann.  Against Obscenity: Reform and the Politics of Womanhood in America, 1873–1935. Johns Hopkins U. Press, 2004.
 Werbel, Amy. Lust on Trial: Censorship and the Rise of American Obscenity in the Age of Anthony Comstock.Columbia University Press, 2018.
 , Hearing on Obscenity Prosecution and the Constitution, Subcommittee on the Constitution, Civil Rights, and Property Rights Committee on the Judiciary United States Senate March 16, 2005 for legal history.

1873 in American law
1873 in the United States
42nd United States Congress
Birth control law and case law
Censorship in the United States
Obscenity law
United States federal legislation articles without infoboxes
United States federal postal legislation
Birth control in the United States
Presidency of Ulysses S. Grant
Sex laws